Khot is a Town in Mulkhow/Torkhow tehsil in  Upper Chitral District, Khyber Pakhtunkhwa, Pakistan.Its main villages included wahshich, puchung, melph, pongodur, jinali

Educational Institutions
GHS Khot
Government Primary School Khot
Govt Girls Primary School Khot Chaji
Salik Public Schools Khot
Agha Khan School Khot
Government High School Khot 
Government Middle School Khot
Government Primary School Zanglasht

See also
Mastuj

References

Chitral District
Tehsils of Chitral District
Union councils of Khyber Pakhtunkhwa
Populated places in Chitral District
Union councils of Chitral District